Saint-Saturnin (French for "Saint Saturninus") is the name or part of the name of several communes in France:

 Saint-Saturnin, Cantal, in the Cantal département
 Saint-Saturnin, Charente, in the Charente département
 Saint-Saturnin, Cher, in the Cher département
 Saint-Saturnin, Lozère, in the Lozère département
 Saint-Saturnin, Marne, in the Marne département
 Saint-Saturnin, Puy-de-Dôme, in the Puy-de-Dôme département
 Saint-Saturnin, Sarthe, in the Sarthe département
 Saint-Saturnin-de-Lenne, in the Aveyron département
 Saint-Saturnin-de-Lucian, in the Hérault département
 Saint-Saturnin-du-Bois, in the Charente-Maritime département
 Saint-Saturnin-du-Limet, in the Mayenne département
 Saint-Saturnin-lès-Apt, in the Vaucluse département
 Saint-Saturnin-lès-Avignon, in the Vaucluse département
 Saint-Saturnin-sur-Loire, in the Maine-et-Loire département

See also
 Saint-Sernin (disambiguation)